The 1941 Washington State Cougars football team was an American football team that represented Washington State College as a member of the Pacific Coast Conference (PCC) during the 1941 college football season. Sixteenth-year head coach Babe Hollingbery led the team to a 6–4 record (5–3 in the PCC).

Schedule

References

External links
 Game program: California at WSC – October 4, 1941
 Game program: Washington at WSC – October 11, 1941
 Game program: Oregon State at WSC – October 25, 1941
 Game program: Idaho at WSC – November 8, 1941
 Game program: Texas A&M vs. WSC at Tacoma – December 6, 1941

Washington State
Washington State Cougars football seasons
Washington State Cougars football